William Lee Austin (October 18, 1928 – May 22, 2013) was an American football player and coach in the National Football League (NFL). He played as a lineman for the New York Giants for seven seasons, was the head coach of the Pittsburgh Steelers for three seasons, (1966–1968) and one for the Washington Redskins in 1970.

Early years
Born in San Pedro, California, Austin was raised in Oregon and graduated from Woodburn High School, south of Portland. He played college football at Oregon State College in Corvallis, earning All-Coast honors as a tackle in 1948 and played in the 1949 East–West Shrine Game. He was inducted into the OSU Athletics Hall of Fame and was a member of Phi Delta Theta fraternity.

Playing career
Selected in the thirteenth round of the 1949 NFL draft with the 126th overall pick, Austin played seven seasons with the Giants, including the 1956 title year. He missed the 1951 and 1952 seasons due to military service in the U.S. Army, stationed in San Francisco and Tokyo. He made the Pro Bowl in 1954 and retired after the 1957 season.

Coaching career
Austin began his coaching career at Wichita University for a season in 1958, then joined first-year head coach Vince Lombardi as offensive line coach for the Green Bay Packers in 1959. Lombardi was the offensive coordinator of the Giants for the previous five seasons, including the 1956 championship year. Austin coached in Green Bay for six seasons, mentoring pulling guards Jerry Kramer and Fuzzy Thurston, and hall of famers Forrest Gregg and Jim Ringo. The Packers played in the NFL championship game for three consecutive seasons, with wins in 1961 and 1962.

Seeking a warmer climate for his wife's health, Austin left Green Bay after the 1964 season for the Los Angeles Rams for a season as an assistant, then became head coach of the Pittsburgh Steelers at age 37 in January 1966, with a recommendation by Lombardi. He failed to produce a winning season in three seasons, finishing 11–28–3, and was fired after the 1968 season (2–11–1), succeeded by Chuck Noll.

Austin rejoined Lombardi in Washington as an assistant in 1969, then took over as interim head coach when Lombardi died of cancer before the 1970 season on September 3. Dismissed by telephone after that 6–8 season, he returned to his role as an assistant coach in the NFL (and USFL) for the remainder of his career, including a stint as offensive line coach for the Giants in the early 1980s.

Austin was inducted into the Oregon Sports Hall of Fame in 1982, and retired to Las Vegas in 1985. He died at age 84 at his home in Las Vegas in 2013.

Head coaching record

Note: Tie games were not officially counted in the standings until .

References

External links
 
 

1928 births
2013 deaths
American football offensive linemen
Green Bay Packers coaches
Los Angeles Rams coaches
New York Giants coaches
New York Giants players
Oregon State Beavers football players
Pittsburgh Steelers coaches
St. Louis Cardinals (football) coaches
Washington Redskins coaches
Wichita State Shockers football coaches
United States Football League coaches
Eastern Conference Pro Bowl players
Players of American football from Los Angeles
People from Woodburn, Oregon
Players of American football from Oregon
United States Army soldiers
Sports coaches from Los Angeles
Pittsburgh Steelers head coaches
Washington Redskins head coaches